Uilleam is a masculine given name in the Scottish Gaelic language. It is the equivalent of the name William in English.

List of people with the given name
Uilleam, Earl of Mar
Uilleam I, Earl of Ross
Uilleam II, Earl of Ross
Uilleam III, Earl of Ross

References

Scottish Gaelic masculine given names